Caleb Orobosa Benenoch (born August 2, 1994) is an American football guard who is a free agent. He played college football at UCLA and was drafted by the Tampa Bay Buccaneers in the fifth round of the 2016 NFL Draft. He has also played for the New England Patriots, Carolina Panthers, Dallas Cowboys, and Detroit Lions.

Early years
Benenoch was born in Nigeria and played association football (soccer) in early childhood before migrating to Katy, Texas at nine. He started to play the American gridiron game by mistake as his mother signed him up for "football".

College career
Benenoch played college football for the UCLA Bruins from 2013 to 2015.

Professional career

Tampa Bay Buccaneers
Benenoch was drafted by the Tampa Bay Buccaneers in the fifth round, 148th overall, of the 2016 NFL Draft. He played in five games as a rookie, earning his first career start at the right guard position in Week 10 against the Chicago Bears in place of the injured Kevin Pamphile.

In 2018, Benenoch was named the Buccaneers starting right guard, starting all 16 games.

On September 10, 2019, Benenoch was released by the Buccaneers.

New England Patriots
On September 17, 2019, Benenoch signed with the New England Patriots. On October 1, 2019, he was released.

Carolina Panthers
On October 1, 2019, Benenoch was claimed off waivers by the Carolina Panthers. He was released on October 22, 2019.

Dallas Cowboys
Benenoch was signed by the Dallas Cowboys on December 1, 2019, after a season-ending injury to Connor Williams. He was released on December 14, 2019.

Detroit Lions
On December 16, 2019, Benenoch was claimed off waivers by the Detroit Lions. Benenoch was released by the Lions on August 23, 2020.

New England Patriots (second stint)
On September 12, 2020, Benenoch was signed to the New England Patriots practice squad. He was elevated to the active roster on October 17 for the team's week 6 game against the Denver Broncos, and reverted to the practice squad after the game. He was placed on the practice squad/injured list by the team on November 13. His practice squad contract with the team expired after the season on January 11, 2021.

Buffalo Bills
On August 4, 2021, Benenoch was signed by the Buffalo Bills. He was waived on August 15.

New Orleans Saints
On August 18, 2021, Benenoch signed with the New Orleans Saints. He was released on August 31, 2021 and re-signed to the practice squad. He was promoted to the active roster on December 2.

New York Jets
On August 8, 2022, Benenoch signed with the New York Jets. On August 23, 2022, he was released.

References

External links 
 UCLA Bruins bio

1994 births
Living people
American football offensive tackles
Buffalo Bills players
Carolina Panthers players
Dallas Cowboys players
Detroit Lions players
New England Patriots players
New Orleans Saints players
New York Jets players
Nigerian players of American football
People from Katy, Texas
Players of American football from Texas
Sportspeople from Harris County, Texas
Tampa Bay Buccaneers players
UCLA Bruins football players